Barr Trail is a  trail in the Pike National Forest that begins in Manitou Springs, Colorado and ends at the Pikes Peak summit. The high elevation trail with a long sustained grade is rated more difficult by the U.S. Forest Service. With a  elevation gain to reach the summit, the Colorado Springs Convention & Visitors Bureau states that it is an advanced trail and is the most difficult trail in the Pikes Peak region.

Barr Trail is used for the Pikes Peak Ascent, Pikes Peak Marathon, and the Barr Trail Mountain Race. The Ascent and Marathon start in Manitou Springs in front of City Hall and connect with the Barr Trail from upper Ruxton Ave. Both races ascend to the Pikes Peak summit at 14,115'. The Marathon is an out-and-back race that finishes at Ruxton and Manitou Avenues in Manitou Springs. The 12.6-mile course for the Barr Trail Mountain Race starts at the Cog Railway Depot and ascends to Barr Camp at 10,200', then reverses back down to the trailhead via Hydro Street.

History
A trail was first created by a prospector in the mid-1800s, but the trail did not allow for travel by burro from Mount Manitou to the summit of Pikes Peak. Beginning in 1914, Fred Barr built the burro trail, with a maximum 12% grade to the top of the peak for his burro train business. Aside from his work on the major portion of the trail, he supervised a crew of ten men for the U.S. Forest Service in 1917 who built the portion of the trail from the top of the Manitou Incline down to Manitou Springs. He hiked the entire trail and made it to the top of Pikes Peak on Christmas Eve, 1918.

Barr Camp was built by Barr between 1922 and 1924. It was used by Barr and his burro train customers for an overnight stay between Manitou Incline and the summit. Staffed by year-round caretakers, the camp continued to provide overnight accommodations for Barr Trail hikers.

In 1948, the U.S. Forest Service rebuilt the trail, following the original route. Burro trains were used to transport people along the trail until the 1960s.

The 13-mile trail was designated a National Recreation Trail in 1979. It is one of the most frequently used trails in Colorado.

Trail
Points along the trail include:

On average, it can take six to ten hours to reach the summit from the trailhead. Many people schedule their hikes or overnight stays so that they are on the summit by noon in the summer, with the return trip down the mountain shortly after to avoid the threat of lightning. Other considerations are managing altitude, temperature, and weather changes. For instance, regardless of the season it may be 40 degrees colder on the summit than at the trail head.

Notes

References

External links
 The Hike, Barr Camp
 The Barr Trail

Protected areas of El Paso County, Colorado
National Recreation Trails in Colorado
Pikes Peak
Manitou Springs, Colorado